Nivethan Radhakrishnan (born 25 November 2002) is an Indian-born Australian cricketer. He is an all-rounder who bats left-handed and possesses the ability to bowl right-arm off spin and left-arm spin.

Personal life 
Radhakrishnan was born in Chennai, Tamil Nadu, India. He moved to Sydney, New South Wales, Australia, in 2013 at the age of 10, with his father, mother and older brother.  He has cited West Indies all-rounder Sir Garfield Sobers as his idol.

Cricket career 
Radhakrishnan spent the 2017 and 2018 Tamil Nadu Premier League seasons with Karaikudi Kaalai and Dindigul Dragons, respectively. In 2019, he played for an Australian Under-16 team in Dubai against Pakistan. In 2020, he was one of the four cricketers to win the Bill O'Reilly Medal and also received the Basil Sellers Scholarship. In 2021, he was a net bowler for the Indian Premier League franchise, the Delhi Capitals. In the same year, he earned his first professional contract with the Tasmanian Tigers.

In December 2021, he was named in Australia's team for the 2022 ICC Under-19 Cricket World Cup in the West Indies. He made his first-class debut on 18 February 2022, for Tasmania in the 2021–22 Sheffield Shield season.

References 

2002 births
Living people
Australian cricketers
Australian people of Tamil descent
Australian sportspeople of Indian descent
Indian emigrants to Australia
Cricketers from Chennai
Cricketers from Sydney
Sportsmen from New South Wales
Tasmania cricketers